Silverstoneia flotator, the rainforest rocket frog, is a terrestrial, diurnal frog found in humid lowlands of Costa Rica and Panama. It is generally very common and therefore considered to be of least concern by the IUCN. The taxonomy is in need of a review, as it may consist of a complex of several species.

References

External links

flotator
Amphibians described in 1931
Amphibians of Costa Rica
Amphibians of Panama
Taxa named by Emmett Reid Dunn